Harry Willis may refer to:

 Harry Albert Willis (1904–1972), Canadian politician
 Harry Graham Willis (1875–1943), English administrator in Southern Africa
 Harry Willis (entertainer), Australian musician

See also
 Henry Willis (disambiguation)
 Chuck Willis (Harold Willis, 1928–1958), American singer
 Harry Wills (1889–1958), American boxer